Asafo may refer to:
Asafo, traditional Akan fighting group
Kwahu Asafo, a town in the Eastern Region of Ghana
Asafo Kumasi, a town